CG5 may refer to:
 British NVC community CG5, one of the calcicolous grasslandcommunities in the British National Vegetation Classification system
 Charlie Green, a YouTuber known online as CG5
 St. Louis CG-5, a prototype military transport glider
 USS Oklahoma City (CL-91), identified as CG-5